Balgownie transmitting station is a relay transmitter of Durris, situated in Bridge of Don, Aberdeen, and covering Tillydrone, Woodside, parts of Old Aberdeen and the Abbey Road area of Torry. It is owned and operated by Arqiva.

Services listed by frequency

Analogue radio (FM VHF)

Digital radio (DAB)

Digital television
These multiplexes have been broadcast since 15 September 2010. BBC A began broadcasting on 1 September.

Analogue television
These services were broadcast until 15 September 2010. BBC2 Scotland was previously closed on 1 September.

External links
Balgownie at The Transmission Gallery

Transmitter sites in Scotland